Jack Randle (23 August 1902 – May 1990) was an English professional footballer who played as a left back. Born in Bedworth, Warwickshire, Randle worked as a coal miner before joining Coventry City, for whom he played nearly 150 league matches. He went on to play more than 100 Football League First Division matches for Birmingham in a six-year career, during the second half of which he was mainly used as cover for George Liddell. He later played for Southend United, Bournemouth & Boscombe Athletic and Guildford City. He died in Bournemouth in 1990 aged about 87.

References

1902 births
1990 deaths
People from Bedworth
English footballers
Association football fullbacks
Coventry City F.C. players
Birmingham City F.C. players
Southend United F.C. players
AFC Bournemouth players
Guildford City F.C. players
English Football League players
Date of death missing